The Wailin' Jennys are a Canadian music group.  They have released several albums and received two Juno Awards. The group has been featured several times on the American Public Media  program A Prairie Home Companion and their album Firecracker peaked at number two on the Billboard Bluegrass charts, in 2006. Their album Bright Morning Stars peaked at number one on the Billboard Bluegrass charts, in 2011, and Fifteen peaked at number one on the Billboard Bluegrass charts, in 2017.

History
The group was founded in 2002, when a Winnipeg guitar shop called Sled Dog Music brought Ruth Moody, Nicky Mehta and Cara Luft together for a joint performance. The show was well received and the owner, John Sharples, scheduled a follow-up performance and suggested they "go on tour and call themselves the Wailin' Jennys." The group's name is a  pun on the name of country singer Waylon Jennings.

The band released a self-titled EP and an album, 40 Days, in 2004;

The group now consists of soprano Ruth Moody, mezzo Nicky Mehta and alto Heather Masse. In previous years, the Jennys have also toured with fiddler and mandolinist Jeremy Penner, who is from Ruth's former band, Scruj MacDuhk. Other band members have included Annabelle Chvostek, a singer/songwriter from Montreal, and Ruth Moody's brother Richard on viola and mandolin.  Both Penner and Moody have appeared on The Wailin' Jennys' albums. In 2007, Chvostek left the group and was replaced by Heather Masse, a Maine-born singer and member of the band Heather & the Barbarians.

The Wailin' Jennys have won two Juno Awards for Roots and Traditional Album of the Year (Group): in 2005 for 40 Days and in 2012 for Bright Morning Stars. They were also nominated for the same award for Firecracker in 2007.

Discography

Albums

Extended plays

References

External links

 
 
 

Musical groups established in 2002
Musical groups from Winnipeg
Canadian alternative country groups
Juno Award for Roots & Traditional Album of the Year – Group winners
2002 establishments in Manitoba
Canadian indie folk groups
Red House Records artists